Pleasant Inn, also known as William F. Simmons House, is a historic boarding house located at Myrtle Beach in Horry County, South Carolina. It was built about 1927 and features a low, two-story height; wood-frame construction; tiered, two-story full facade porches; side stairway leading to upstairs entrance; and rentable rooms for boarders. It also has exposed rafter ends and gable vents. It is one of the few remaining examples of the two-story boarding/guest houses that pre-dates Hurricane Hazel (1954).

It was listed on the National Register of Historic Places in 1996.

References

External links
Pleasant Inn - Myrtle Beach, South Carolina - U.S. National Register of Historic Places on Waymarking.com

Hotel buildings on the National Register of Historic Places in South Carolina
Residential buildings completed in 1927
Hotels established in 1927
Buildings and structures in Myrtle Beach, South Carolina
National Register of Historic Places in Horry County, South Carolina